San Roberto International School, formerly known as Instituto San Roberto, is a private international school located in Monterrey, Mexico. The school was founded in 1982 by Mrs. Monica Sada. , San Roberto International School was part of Nord Anglia Education, the schools organization.

2055 students from 33 countries attend either of the school’s two locations in the Valle Alto area of Monterrey.

The school offers an international academic program for students from PreNursery to grade 9.

History
San Roberto International School was founded in 1982 by Monica Sada. It first opened its doors as a preschool. Activities began in a small rented house in San Pedro Garza García, Nuevo León. The name “San Roberto” was chosen in honor of Mr. Roberto G. Sada Jr., one of Monterrey’s most distinguished businessmen and father of Mrs. Sada. Success in the preschool levels led to the opening of the elementary levels a year later, adding a bilingual program.

The increase in the student body and the need for new facilities led to Mrs. Cristina Sada, the founder’s sister, to join the school as an investor. The new San Agustin Campus opened in November 1984. Middle school levels opened in 1989. To serve the growing population in the southern part of the city, Valle Alto Campus opened its doors in September 1994. Both campuses were accredited by the Southern Association of Colleges and Schools (SACS) in December 2002, and currently hold the accreditation by SACS, now as a division of AdvancED.

In September 2006 the Sada sisters sold the school to the Meritas Family of Schools, a company operating international private schools.

In June 2015, San Roberto International School, along with six of 10 Meritas schools, joined Nord Anglia Education.

References

External links 

 San Roberto International School home page
 San Roberto International School home page 

Monterrey
International schools in Mexico
Educational institutions established in 1982
1982 establishments in Mexico
Education in Nuevo León
Nord Anglia Education